"Off the Hook" is a song by Dutch DJs and producers Hardwell and Armin van Buuren. It was released on 14 September 2015 in the Netherlands. It is the second single from van Buuren's album Embrace.

Background 
It was debuted at the 2015 Ultra Music Festival in March.

Track listing

Charts

References 

2015 singles
2015 songs
Hardwell songs
Songs written by Benno de Goeij
Songs written by Armin van Buuren
Songs written by Hardwell